The 2020–21 season was Gabala FK's 16th season, and their 15th in the Azerbaijan Premier League, the top-flight of Azerbaijani football.

Season events
On 10 August, Gabala announced the signing of Jurgen Goxha to a one-year contract, with the option of an additional year.

On 14 August, Gabala announced the signing of Stefan Vukčević to a one-year contract, with the option of an additional year.

On 8 September, Gabala announced the signing of Vinko Međimorec to a one-year contract, with the option of an additional year.

On 11 September, Gabala announced the signing of Raphael Utzig to a one-year contract, with the option of an additional year.

On 5 October, Gismat Aliyev was sold to Zira

On 27 November, Gabala's match against Sumgayit scheduled for 28 November was postponed due to players testing positive for COVID-19, and Spanish club UD Montijo announced the signing of Rodrigo Gattas from Gabala.

Squad

Transfers

In

Loans in

Out

Released

Friendlies

Competitions

Premier League

Results summary

Results by round

Results

League table

Azerbaijan Cup

Squad statistics

Appearances and goals

|-
|colspan="14"|Players away from Gabala on loan:
|-
|colspan="14"|Players who left Gabala during the season:

|}

Goal scorers

Clean sheets

Disciplinary record

References

External links 
Gabala FC Website

Gabala FC seasons
Azerbaijani football clubs 2020–21 season